Xylosan (1,4-anhydro-α-D-xylopyranose) is a molecule produced during pyrolysis of the hemicellulose found in wood. Xylosan is the dehydrated product of the 5-carbon xylose sugar monomer, a major component of hemicellulose.

References

Monosaccharides
Vicinal diols
Oxygen heterocycles